David George Alexander McLean,  (born June 25, 1938) is a Canadian lawyer, businessman and the chairman of the Board of the Canadian National Railway Company, and formerly of BC Rail until it was acquired by CN.

Born in Calgary, Alberta, he received a Bachelor of Arts degree in 1959 and a Bachelor of Law degree in 1962 from the University of Alberta.

In 1972, he founded his own real estate investment firm, The McLean Group and is the chairman of the board and chief executive officer.  The McLean Group owns Vancouver Film Studios, one of Vancouver's largest film industry companies.

In 1994, he was appointed to the Board of Directors of Canadian National Railway Company (he was also a member of the Board from 1979 to 1986) and became chairman in December 1994.  He also served as Chair of the University of British Columbia's Board of Governors.

He was appointed to the Order of British Columbia in 1999. He is a Knight of Justice in the Sovereign Order of St. John of Jerusalem.

On January 24, 2018, he was appointed the Honorary Lieutenant-Colonel of the Seaforth Highlanders of Canada.

On May 26, 2021, He was appointed the Honorary Colonel of The Seaforth Highlanders Of Canada.

References
 
 
 

1938 births
Living people
Lawyers in British Columbia
Businesspeople from Calgary
Knights of Justice of the Order of St John
Members of the Order of British Columbia
University of Alberta alumni
University of Alberta Faculty of Law alumni